Masterson Station is a neighborhood in northwestern Lexington, Kentucky, United States. Its boundaries are Masterson Station Park on the west, Leestown Road to the south, Greendale Road to the east, and Spurr Road to the north.

Neighborhood statistics
 Area: 
 Population: 926
 Population density: 1,193 people per square mile (461/km2)
 Median household income: $81,272

References

Neighborhoods in Lexington, Kentucky